Savages of the Sea is a 1925 American silent action film directed by Bruce Mitchell and starring Frank Merrill, Melbourne MacDowell and Marguerite Snow. It was produced by independent Bud Barsky as a supporting feature.

Synopsis
Yacht owner Daniel Rawley, his ward Stella and a stowaway Saunders are shipwrecked in the South Seas. They are rescued by a ship run by a tyrannical captain.

Cast
 Frank Merrill as 	Silent Saunders
 Melbourne MacDowell as 	Daniel Rawley
 Marguerite Snow as 	Stella Rawley
 Danny Hoy as Ginger
 Clarence Burton as 	Black Brock

References

Bibliography
 Connelly, Robert B. The Silents: Silent Feature Films, 1910-36, Volume 40, Issue 2. December Press, 1998.
 Munden, Kenneth White. The American Film Institute Catalog of Motion Pictures Produced in the United States, Part 1. University of California Press, 1997.

External links
 

1925 films
1920s action films
American silent feature films
American action films
Films directed by Bruce M. Mitchell
American black-and-white films
Seafaring films
1920s English-language films
1920s American films
Silent adventure films